Patriotic Europeans Against the Islamisation of the West, abbreviated Pegida (stylised in its logo as PEGIDA), is a pan-European, anti-Islam, far-right political movement. German Pegida believes that Germany is being increasingly Islamicised and defines itself in opposition to Islamic extremism.

Pegida wants to curb immigration into Germany and it accuses the authorities of failure to enforce related laws. Pegida has held many demonstrations, often accompanied by counter-demonstrations. He was later reinstated.

Though nationalism is a central feature, Pegida offshoots have formed in various countries. It is a grassroots part of the counter-jihad movement.

History

Origin

's impetus for starting Pegida was witnessing a rally by alleged supporters of the Kurdistan Workers' Party (PKK) against the siege of Kobani by the Islamic State (ISIL) on 10 October 2014 in Dresden, which he posted on YouTube on the same day. The next day he founded a Facebook group called  ('Patriotic Europeans against Islamisation of the Occident').

On 26 October, out of 5,000 protesters, "at least 400 right-wing extremists went on a rampage in downtown Cologne during a demonstration" by "Hooligans Against Salafists".  mentioned these events in a release for his first demonstration.

First wave of demonstrations
The first demonstration, or "evening stroll" (according to Pegida), took place on 20 October 2014, and attracted only a handful of people. During the following days, the movement began gaining wider public attention, and, subsequently, the weekly Monday demonstrations drew larger numbers of people. Among the 7,500 participants on 1 December 2014, the police identified 80 to 120 hooligans. The demonstration grew to 10,000 people on 8 December 2014.

During the weekly demonstrations on Monday evenings, Pegida supporters carried banners with slogans such as "For the preservation of our culture", "Against religious fanaticism, against any kind of radicalism, together without violence" and "Against religious wars on German soil".

Pegida also formally applied for the status of a nonprofit organization.

Aftermath of Charlie Hebdo shooting and rising tensions

While the demonstration on 29 December 2014 was cancelled by the organizers, the movement continued to draw large numbers of participants in early January 2015. After the Charlie Hebdo shooting on 7 January 2015 in Paris, politicians (including ministers  and ) warned Pegida against misusing the attack on Charlie Hebdo for its own political agenda.

On 12 January 2015, Pegida organizers organised a rally of some 25,000 participants. Pegida's main organizer, declared the six central political objectives of Pegida, which include calls for selective immigration and the expulsion of religious extremists, the right and duty to integrate, and tighter internal security.

On 15 January 2015, a young Eritrean immigrant, Khaled Idris Bahray, was found stabbed to death in his Dresden high-rise apartment. International media correspondents portrayed an "atmosphere of hatred and resentment" and published social media comments of Pegida sympathizers, who had expressed disdain for the dead Eritrean. Pegida's organizers rejected any possible connection. One week later, the police investigation led to the arrest and eventual conviction of one of the victim's Eritrean housemates.

Dresden police did not permit the demonstration planned for 19 January 2015, due to a definite threat against one of Pegida's leadership members in form of an Arabic-language tweet labelling Pegida an "enemy of Islam". Pegida cancelled its 13th demonstration and stated in a post on its Facebook page that there was an explicit threat against a leadership member, and "his execution had been ordered by ISIS terrorists".

Resignations
On 21 January 2015, Bachmann resigned from his position in Pegida after coming under fire for a number of Facebook posts. Excerpts from a closed Facebook conversation incriminated Bachmann as having referred to immigrants with the insults "animals", "scumbags" and "trash", which are classified as hate speech in Germany. He was also quoted as commenting that extra security was needed at the welfare office "to protect employees from the animals". A self-portrait of Bachmann allegedly posing as a reincarnation of Adolf Hitler, titled "He's back!" (which the  later discovered to be a forgery, reporting that the moustache was added after the photo was taken), went viral on social media and was printed on front pages worldwide. On another occasion, Bachmann had posted a photo of a man wearing the uniform of the US white supremacist organisation Ku Klux Klan accompanied by the slogan: "Three Ks a day keeps the minorities away". The Dresden state prosecutors opened an investigation for suspected  (incitement to hatred), and Deputy Chancellor Sigmar Gabriel said the real face of Pegida had been exposed: "Anyone who puts on a Hitler disguise is either an idiot or a Nazi. People should think carefully about running after a pied piper like this".

On that same day  announced 's resignation.

On 28 January,  resigned as well, citing "the massive hostility, threats and career disadvantages" as the reason. At the same time four other leading figures of Pegida stepped back. On 2 February 2015  and six other former Pegida members founded  ('Direct Democracy for Europe') to distance themselves from the far-right tendencies of Pegida.

Reinstatement
In February 2015, Pegida confirmed on its Facebook page that  had been re-elected as chairman by the six other members of the organisation's leadership committee, after the  published a report that the Hitler moustache on the now infamous photo had been added after the photo was taken.

Dresden mayoral election, 2015
In June 2015, following the resignation of CDU incumbent  on health grounds, who was dismissed from Pegida's leadership circle in June 2016, ran for the mayoral office of Dresden, polling 9.6% in the first round with support from the far-right National Democratic Party of Germany (NPD). On 7 July 2015,  announced that Pegida would participate in all future federal elections in Germany.

Renewed protests

The European migrant crisis revived the movement, which drew as many as 20,000 supporters to a 19 October 2015 rally in Dresden. At the same time, observers perceived a further radicalisation of the crowd.

On 28 September, two journalists were injured when Pegida participants kicked a local newspaper reporter and punched another TV reporter in the face. On 12 October, Pegida demonstrators carried a mock gallows showing nooses reserved for Chancellor  and her deputy .  derided the demonstrators who made it, calling it a "laughable piece of work with spelling errors" (""), a reference to the fact that the name Sigmar had been written with an "ie".

At Pegida's anniversary event on 19 October 2015, keynote speaker  named the Muslim refugees as invaders, with Germany becoming a "Muslim garbage dump".  said that politicians were acting like " against their own people", as they wanted critics of Germany's refugee policy to leave the country. Addressing the crowd shouting "Resistance!", he claimed that the majority of Germans were held in contempt by the political class and that politicians wished that there were "other alternatives [to fight Pegida supporters] – but the concentration camps are unfortunately out of order at the moment". The crowd applauded and laughed, and let him continue his speech for another 20 minutes before calling upon him to finish.

When 1,500 to 2,000 people celebrated Pegida in 's first anniversary, dozens of hooligans protested, vandalizing foreign-owned shops. Over 100 people were arrested. Mayor Burkhard Jung called it "open street terror".

Party founding 
The FDDV was established on 13 June 2016. Tommy Robinson founded a branch of Pegida in the United Kingdom.

Position paper

At the beginning of December 2014, Pegida published an undated and anonymous one-page manifesto of 19 bulleted position statements.

Pegida's specific demands were initially unclear, largely because Pegida has refused a dialogue, considering the press to be a politically correct conspiracy. Demonstrators have been observed chanting  (lying press), a term that has a long history in German politics.

Alongside the German national flag, supporters of the movement have often been seen with a variant of the "Wirmer flag", a flag proposed by resistance member  in 1944 for use after World War II.

According to a  report from December 2014, Pegida considers Islamism a misogynist and violent ideology. In January 2015 The Guardian described Pegida as a far-right movement, The New York Times labelled Pegida as anti-immigrant, and Angela Merkel has repeatedly questioned the motives underlying its anti-immigrant message.

The State Authority for the Protection of the Constitution of Thuringia considers  (the regional Pegida branch of South Thuringia) to be steered by right-wing nationalists.

In February 2015 the 19 positions were revised and broken down to the ten "Theses of Dresden".

On 10 September 2015, Pegida demanded ten changes to the German refugee policy. They called for an immediate stop for asylum seekers and for a German 'asylum-emergency law'.

Participants and supporters

According to Frank Richter, director of Saxony's Federal Agency for Civic Education, Pegida is "a mixed group—known figures from the National Democratic Party of Germany, soccer hooligans, but also a sizable number of ordinary citizens". , director of the Migration Council, has pointed out that the movement is strongest where people have hardly any experience with foreigners, and among "easterners who never really arrived in the Federal Republic and who now feel they have no voice".

In December, president of Saxony's State Authority for the Protection of the Constitution, said that initial suspicion that Pegida might tie in with the riots staged by  earlier in Cologne were not substantiated, so the movement was not put under official surveillance. He said there were no indications that the organizers were embracing right-wingers. This assessment was contested by the weekly  who researched the ideological proximity of Pegida organizer  to the German Defence League or the European Identitarian movement. In a  interview on 19 January, Meyer-Plath reaffirmed that the participant spectrum was very diverse and that there was no evidence of radicalisation.

Dresden University of Technology (TU) interviewed 400 Pegida demonstrators on 22 December 2014 and 12 January 2015. According to the poll, the main reasons of their participation were dissatisfaction with the political situation (54 percent), "Islam, Islamism and Islamisation" (23 percent), criticism of the media and the public (20 percent), and reservations regarding asylum seekers and migrants (15 percent). In all, 42 percent had reservations regarding Muslims or Islam, 20 percent were concerned about a 'high rate of crimes' committed by asylum seekers, or feared socio-economic disadvantages. The author, did not see Pegida as a movement of right-wing extremists, pensioners or the unemployed, but stated that the rallies served as a way to express feelings and resentments against a political and opinion-making elite which have not been publicly articulated before.

A group of social scientists led by Dieter Rucht from the Social Science Research Centre of Berlin collected data both by flyer and online survey. Despite a participation rate of only 18 percent in the online survey, it largely had similar results to the survey in Dresden. According to data from the WZB, Pegida was a male-dominated group, participants were mostly employees with a relatively high level of education, they had no confidence in institutions and they sympathised with AfD. In some cases the participants demonstrated far-right and right-wing extremist attitudes. The conclusion emphasised that Pegida supporters cannot be viewed as 'ordinary citizens', since they articulate group-focused enmity and racism.

 on Facebook, the Pegida fan page had about 200,000 supporters. According to political consultant , the fanpage allows the users there to present and more easily spread their ideas, which are not represented in the mainstream media.

In December 2014, representatives of the NPD encouraged people to participate in Pegida rallies, as did the German Defence League and the internet blog Politically Incorrect in an uploaded 'propaganda clip'. According to the police, a few hundred "violent hooligans" have been participating in the Dresden rallies since December 2014. The journalist  supports Pegida with his new right youth magazine .

Reactions

Counterdemonstrations

Numerous protests against Pegida and affiliated movements in cities across Germany have drawn up to 35,000 demonstrators in Dresden and up to 100,000 nationwide in January 2015, considerably more than Pegida's own concurrent demonstrations.

In protest against a Pegida march, the floodlights of the Catholic Cologne Cathedral were switched off on the evening of 5 January 2015. Dresden's  plant used the same method of protest.

Polls
According to a survey by the Emnid institute conducted in December 2014, 53% of East Germans and 48% of West Germans showed understanding for Pegida demonstrations.

On behalf of German  newspaper , YouGov conducted a survey from 12 to 15 December 2014. The survey showed that 30% of all 1107 surveyed felt sympathetic with regards to the demonstrations. Another 19% said they were understanding rather than the opposite. 26% approved at least partially of the demonstrations, while 10% showed little sympathy and a further 13% no understanding at all.

A survey by TNS Infratest conducted in December 2014 on behalf of German magazine  showed that 65% of all surveyed German citizens felt that the government did not respond appropriately to their concerns about asylum policy and immigration. 28% disagreed, while 34% observed an increasing Islamisation in Germany.

A representative survey by Emnid conducted from 17 to 18 December 2014 showed that 85% of all 1006 surveyed were not willing to participate in demonstrations for Pegida policy. Only 9%, more than half of all surveyed AfD followers, said they were in fact willing to demonstrate.

On 18 December 2014, the Forsa Institute conducted a survey which showed that 67% of all surveyed Germans considered the danger of Islamisation exaggerated. 29%, consisting of 71% of all surveyed AfD supporters, felt too strong an Islamic influence in Germany and deemed respective demonstrations justified. 13% said they would participate in protests near their residence. 10%, consisting of 57% of all surveyed AfD followers, would even vote for an anti-Islamic party.

A special report by the Bertelsmann Foundation, complemented by a TNS Emnid survey from November 2014, showed that a majority of German citizens considered Islam dangerous. Consequently, there seemed to be a "strong sympathy" for "Pegida slogans". In absolute numbers, 57% of all surveyed thought of Islam as a danger. 40% felt like "foreigners in their own country", while 24% stated that they would like to prevent further Muslim immigration. These opinions were not exclusive to any political camps or social classes.

Political opponents
Chancellor  has criticised Pegida, saying that the leaders of Pegida "have prejudice, coldness, even hatred in their hearts". The Federal Minister of the Interior  said that among the participants of the mass rallies were many ordinary people who expressed their concerns about the challenges of today's society. , the leader of the political party Alliance for Progress and Renewal, has said he considers most of the positions of Pegida to be legitimate. Similarly, the Dresden city council's AfD faction welcomed Pegida's weekly demonstrations.

, chairman of the Central Council of Jews in Germany, voiced his opposition to the group, saying that the possibility of an Islamic conquest of Germany would be as "absurd" as a resurrection of the Nazi regime.  described Pegida as being "highly dangerous": "It starts with verbal assault and leads to actual attacks like the one on a planned refugee hostel in Bavaria". He referred to an arson attack on a home for asylum-seekers that was ready for occupation. After the attack, swastika graffiti was found at the scene. Schuster said that Pegida is a combination of "neo-Nazis, far-right parties and citizens who think they are finally allowed to show their racism and xenophobia openly". He condemned the movement, stating that the fear of Islamist terror was being exploited to disparage an entire religion.

 from the Central Council of Muslims in Germany stated that again and again right-wing extremists gave the public the false impression of a racist Germany. The slogans of the protesters showed that xenophobia and anti-Semitic racism had become socially acceptable.

Pegida has been criticised by Lutheran clergy, including the Bishop of Hamburg .

's credibility as a leader has been criticised because he has numerous criminal convictions, including "16 burglaries, drink-driving or driving without a licence and even dealing in cocaine". In 1998 he fled to South Africa to avoid German justice, but was finally extradited and served his two-year jail sentence.

In November 2014, Saxony's Interior Minister,  (CDU), claimed that foreign criminals stayed in Germany too long. He announced the creation of a special police unit to deal with criminal immigrants in Dresden and the rest of Saxony. Investigators and specialists in criminal and immigrant law would collaborate to process foreign criminals in the criminal justice system, and prevent those not eligible for asylum from obtaining the right to stay in Germany.  admitted that there had been a number of criminal acts committed by immigrants near the homes for asylum-seekers, but these were a minority and should not be allowed to undermine solidarity with the great majority of law-abiding refugees. He said police worked on criminal immigrant cases too slowly.

On the night of 5 January 2015, the lights illuminating the Brandenburg Gate were completely turned off in protest against the Berlin offshoot named  and also the lights of the Catholic cathedral  in Cologne in repudiation against . Both rallies in Berlin and Cologne were successfully blocked and disbanded by counter-demonstrations.

Reactions from political scientists
Political scientist  from Dresden believes that politicians are "clueless" when it comes to dealing with Pegida. He says that this points to a serious problem in society, which neither the left wing nor parties of the political middle ground concern themselves with. This allows new social initiatives critical of Islam and immigrants to form. According to him, the demonstrators are normal people approachable by the CDU, if only the party stopped following ostrich policy concerning immigration.

Far-right politics expert  thinks that the demands in Pegida's position paper stem from the middle class centre-right and could as well be the content of CDU/CSU's position papers. Social psychologist  from the Institute for Interdisciplinary Research on Conflict and Violence (IKG) assesses the party as a "middle-class right-wing populist movement".

According to right-wing extremism researcher , Pegida states what many people think.  says that these opinions are widespread in society and that great anti-democratic potential is erupting there. According to political scientist  Germany is facing "a right-wing oriented group of enraged citizens" that "mingles with members of the right-wing scene and even hooligans". Political scientist Hajo Funke sees a connection between Pegida and the great increase in attacks on asylum seekers in 2014. He says that because politics did not react to the population's fear of ever-increasing numbers of asylum seekers, these groups could use these fears and fan them further.

In his article for the German newspaper , political scientist and historian  called it "cynical to want to place Pegida in the tradition of 1989". The demonstrators in Dresden do not align themselves with the philosophy of the extreme right-wing, he says, but they fit the bill for "extremism of the centre ground", which is widespread in Saxony and for whose "group-based misanthropy ... at times the CDU, but prevalently the NPD and as of now the AfD stand" in parliament.

In a similar fashion, historian  traces the fact that Pegida were able to form in Dresden back to the city's history. In one of his columns in the  he referred to the Jewish emancipation of 19th century Saxony, where the comparatively few resident Jews were faced with unequally difficult legal obstacles.  concluded that in Dresden "freedom, self-aggrandising local presumption and fear of foreigners" have long belonged together.

Political philosopher  considers Pegida an anti-political movement. While politics was based on pluralism, Pegida was in fact anti-pluralistic and thus anti-political. In 's eyes, the movement has neither an appreciation of otherness nor empathy, which he sees as the basic virtue of political action.

Explaining especially those protests against the actually non-existent threat of Islamisation from people with middle-class backgrounds, political scientist  referred to results from studies on prejudice. These studies indicate that aggressive prejudices do not originate from those groups met with resentment, but are rather a result of the situation of those who have them. In addition, fear of social decline often seems to be expressed through aggression. This is then directed especially against those minorities which may seem dangerous, but are in reality unable to defend themselves, often due to a perceived unpopularity within the respective society. In the first half of the 20th century, it was the Jewish minority who were imputed with plans for world domination. Today, it is the Muslim minority who is accused of plotting an Islamisation of Europe.

In an interview about Pegida, researcher on prejudice  referred to his previous warnings about right-wing extremists using the fear of foreign infiltration for their ends. It was not the formation but the attendance figures that really surprised him.

Political scientist and researcher on extremism  considers Pegida demonstrations "a new phenomenon of xenophobia". In an interview, he accused Pegida leaders of fuelling "hostility and hatred against people of different ethnicity or religion".

On 5 January 2015, the Council on Migration called for a new general orientation in German society. Since, in their eyes, migration was controllable only to a limited extent, they suggested an orientation committee. Consisting of politicians and representatives of immigrants and minorities, this would work together in order to analyse and redefine "German identity and solidarity in a pluralist republican society". Their results were to be included in German schools' curricula in order to emphasize the historical importance of migration in Germany. In the eyes of the Council, German policy has been influenced for far too long by the CDU's guiding principle of "Germany not being a land of immigration". Thus, a concept of integration should include foreigners and refugees in German society. According to the Council, German integration policy should not only focus on immigrants, but also provide courses on integration for groups such as Pegida. Praising German Chancellor 's distancing herself from Pegida, the Council stressed that an immigration society is a very complex construct.

Political theorist  considers Pegida a part of increasingly right-wing populist tendencies in Europe, in their Islamophobia possibly being the heir to widespread antisemitism. He claims that the demonstrations themselves expose the movement's moderate position paper as a fig leaf for "blatantly unconstitutional xenophobia". Thus, democrats should not sympathize with the movement, as their referring in particular to Judeo-Christian values was contrary to their actual demands.  also voiced concerns about the "ghosts of the old nationalism re-entering Germany through the back door". According to political theorists, a democracy needs to be measured by how it protects its minorities. A knowledge of foreign cultures should be taught in schools. Only in this way would it be possible to understand globalisation as a chance for cultural enrichment in the face of global terrorism.

International reactions
The controversy around Pegida sparked reactions from international media as well. In France,  wrote that Islamophobia divided German society, while  and  discussed possible parallels to the French far-right National Front. Several French and francophone cartoonists published a flyer aimed against a funeral march by Pegida in the wake of the Charlie Hebdo shooting in January 2015. The signatories – among them a surviving member of Charlie Hebdos editorial staff – disapproved of Pegida using the mourning to gather attention for their own cause. They stated that Pegida symbolised everything Charlie Hebdo had fought against and asked the population of Dresden for more tolerance and to be open towards different cultures.

The Times claimed that, for the first time since 1945, a German populist movement was publicly complaining about an ethnic minority. This would frighten the establishment. BBC News said that Germany is not used to such large numbers of demonstrators supporting such positions. The Guardian described Pegida as an emerging campaign against immigrants that would eventually endanger tourism.

The New York Times claimed that, because of its communist history, East Germany was more xenophobic than the rest of the country. The paper claimed that, in light of the low numbers of Muslims living in Saxony, the fear of Islamisation was bizarre.

Russia Today reported comprehensively on Pegida. Its subsidiary Ruptly broadcast several rallies live on the internet.

Turkey's  and  reported on Pegida and counterrallies. Sabah interpreted the demonstrations as a "rise of the radical right in Europe". He said that both had an archaic mindset and that Turkey was "very concerned about Pegida". He called the movement a "threat to Turks, Muslims and Germany itself".

The Arabic news network Al Jazeera primarily reported on counter-demonstrations.

Offshoots and variations

In Germany
The latter were said to have been taken over by members of the openly xenophobic right-wing splinter party Pro NRW.

In December 2014, rival right-wing forces founded an anti-American Facebook group under the name PEGADA (or "Patriotic Europeans Against the Americanisation of the West"), claiming the true problem was not the phenomenon of Islamism but the suspected American forces behind it. On 25 January they held a first rally in Erfurt under the title EnDgAmE (or "Committed democrats against the Americanisation of Europe"). Promoted by a number of activists of the Third Position -Movement and by Hooligans against Salafists. They attracted some 1,000 protesters, but were opposed by 800 mostly left-wing counter-demonstrators including Erfurt's mayor  and trade union members,  and the local Antifa.

Another offshoot, drew scrutiny after several of its members became involved in a neo-Nazi plot to bomb a refugee centre.

International

In January 2015, Pegida sympathizers held their first rally in Oslo, Norway, with around 200 protesters, but this support quickly collapsed. In neighbouring Denmark, around 200 protesters marched in the capital, Copenhagen. In the same month, a Spanish branch applied for a protest outside the main mosque in Madrid, which was rejected by government officials. Marches were planned in Switzerland and Antwerp, Belgium, but not permitted due to anti-terrorism raids in Verviers one week earlier. The Antwerp demonstration was finally held on 2 March 2015 without the mayor's permission. About 350 persons were present and about 227 of them were fined for participating in an unauthorised demonstration.

On 28 February 2015, Pegida UK held its first protest in Newcastle upon Tyne, with around 400 attending. Around 1,000 people turned up to oppose, led by former MP George Galloway. There was a small Pegida demonstration in London on 4 April 2015, with a counter-demonstration by anti-fascist groups.

When Pegida called a demonstration in  they gathered four persons. In Uppsala, Pegida managed to gather about ten persons. Following several failed demonstrations and internal strife the Swedish branch dissolved.

A demonstration on 28 March 2015 in Montreal, Canada, by sympathizers of Pegida was cancelled when hundreds of people gathered to counter-protest. A demonstration on 19 September 2015 in Toronto was attended by about a dozen members of Pegida Canada. The demonstration ended in a melee with counter-protesters who outnumbered Pegida members about twenty to one.

Political scientist Farid Hafez argues that Pegida was not able to settle down in Austria, since the far right FPÖ already represented the ideology of Pegida in parliament and absorbed most of the far right human resources.

Pegida Ireland had planned to have its inaugural rally in Dublin on 6 February 2016, during which Identity Ireland's Peter O’Loughlin, who was also to be chairman of Pegida Ireland, was to speak. While on his way to the rally on a tram, he and members of the movement were attacked by a group of men wearing black masks. The planned rally never took place. A group of Pegida supporters was attacked and chased into a store by a group who broke away from a counter-demonstration.

Fortress Europe
Other signatories present were the Czech organizations  ('Bloc against Islam'),  and Dawn – National Coalition (with the Polish National Movement, the Conservative People's Party of Estonia, and Italy's . 's  said that the meeting was, among other things, a reaction to the attacks on women in Cologne in Germany on New Year's Eve, which took place as celebrations were being held to usher in 2016. At the end of the Prague Declaration, above the signatures, it is stated that there would be demonstrations on 6 February 2016 to manifest their determination. Others who joined Fortress Europe or participated in Pegida-organised demonstrations are: Identity Ireland, Pegida Switzerland, Pegida UK, Reclaim Australia, and former French Foreign Legion General 's group in Calais.

Literature

See also
 Birlikte
 Counter-jihad
 Eurabia
 Islamic fundamentalism
 Jihad and Jihadism
 Stop Islamisation of Europe
 Demographics of Europe

Footnotes

References

Further reading
  Rosellini, Jay. The German New Right: AfD, PEGIDA and the Re-Imagining of National Identity (Hurst, 2020) online review

External links 

 

Dresden
2014 establishments in Germany
Articles containing video clips
Anti-American sentiment in Germany
Anti-immigration politics in Germany
Far-right politics in Germany
Anti-Islam sentiment in Germany
Organisations based in Dresden
Political organisations based in Germany
Racism in Germany
Right-wing populism in Germany
Antisemitism in Germany
Islamophobia in Europe
Counter-jihad
Third Merkel cabinet